Pramuansak Phosuwan (born 22 November 1970) is a Thai boxer. He competed at the 1992 Summer Olympics and the 1996 Summer Olympics.

References

1970 births
Living people
Pramuansak Phosuwan
Pramuansak Phosuwan
Pramuansak Phosuwan
Boxers at the 1992 Summer Olympics
Boxers at the 1996 Summer Olympics
Asian Games medalists in boxing
Boxers at the 1994 Asian Games
Boxers at the 1998 Asian Games
Pramuansak Phosuwan
Pramuansak Phosuwan
Medalists at the 1994 Asian Games
Medalists at the 1998 Asian Games
Flyweight boxers
Pramuansak Phosuwan